Sandip University may refer to one of two universities in India:

 Sandip University, Nashik
 Sandip University, Sijoul